Alexandrina is a given name, a latinate derivative of Alexandra. Notable people with the name include:
 Alexandrina Chezan (born 1939), Romanian volleyball player
 Alexandrina Robertson Harris (1886–1978), Scottish–born American miniature painter
 Alexandrina Maria da Costa (1904–1955), Portuguese mystic of the Eucharist
 Alexandrina Pendatchanska (born 1970), Bulgarian soprano boasting a very dark dramatic timbre
 Alexandrina Matilda MacPhail (1860–1946), Scottish doctor
 Queen Victoria, born Alexandrina Victoria
 Princess Alexandrina of Baden (1820–1904)
 Alexandrina Pendatchanska (born 1970), Bulgarian operatic soprano
 Alexandria Riordan (born 1990), American former figure skater
 Alexandrina Cantacuzino (1876–1944), Romanian political activist
 Alexandrina Chezan (born 1939), Romanian volleyball player
 Alexandrina Hristov (born 1978), Romanian singer
 Alexandrina Jay (born 1949), British social worker and academic

Alexandrina may also refer to:
 Lady Alexandrina de Courcy, a character in the novel Doctor Thorne by Anthony Trollope

See also 
 
 Alexandrina (disambiguation)

References